Mah Now (also Romanized as Māh Now) is a village in Hati Rural District, Hati District, Lali County, Khuzestan Province, Iran. At the 2006 census, its population was 84, in 13 families.

References 

Populated places in Lali County